Ritournelle de la faim (The Same Old Story of Hunger, or The Refrain of Hunger) is a novel written in French by French Nobel laureate J. M. G. Le Clézio .

Plot summary
Set in Paris in the 1930s, it tells the story of Ethel, a young woman who must save herself and her parents, torn by the age's politics and their hatred for each other. The story seems so simple. A narrator who is and is not the author tells the story of a young girl – Ethel Brown – who is and is not the mother of JMG Le Clézio.

French language text sample
French language text sample from "Ritournelle de la faim" can be read online

Publication history

Paris : Lire Magazine
Lire. no. 369, (2008): 64

First French Edition

References

2008 French novels
Novels by J. M. G. Le Clézio
Novels set in Paris
Fiction set in the 1930s
Works by J. M. G. Le Clézio
Éditions Gallimard books